Vindu Dara Singh (born Virender Singh Randhawa; 6 May 1964) is an Indian actor who does Hindi and Punjabi television films. He is the winner of the third season of Bigg Boss. Before this, In 1996 he played the role of Lord Hanuman in Jai Veer Hanuman television series on Sony TV.

Career
Vindu made his acting debut in the 1994 Hindi film Karan. Then he acted in 1996 Punjabi film, Rab Dian Rakhan which was directed by his father. Since then, he has acted in many films, mostly in supporting roles.

He has also acted in TV serials, including the role of Hanuman in the TV serial Jai Veer Hanuman, much like his father did in Ramayan. He has also starred as a supervillain in TV serials on Star Plus, including Zaal in Ssshhhh...Koi Hai (2003) and Char Sau Chalis in Karma (2004). Vindu has also played an important role in the serial Black on 9X where he has played the character of Rajiv, a medium who can establish connections with spirits. Vindu Dara Singh has made appearance in television shows like Master Chef 2, Zor ka Jhatka, Nach Baliye, Comedy Circus, All Most Famous, and Maa Exchange. Singh also paired in a Pepsi commercial with Ranbir Kapoor.

He was the winner of the third season of the reality TV show Bigg Boss in 2009 and was also announced the most stylish and bold contestant to win the Chevrolet Cruze, a feat that had never occurred before, winning both the cash prize and car, and defeating Pravesh Rana and Poonam Dhillon. He was given the title  ('man with a golden heart') by his housemates.

Vindu Dara Singh has also worked in many successful films like Garv, Maine Pyaar Kyun Kiya, Partner, Khushboo, Team - The Force, Kisse Pyaar Karoon, Kambakkht Ishq, Maruti, Mujhse Shaadi Karogi, Son of Sardaar, Jatt James Bond, The Lion of Punjab, Housefull, and Housefull 2.

Personal life

Vindu's father was the wrestler-turned-actor Dara Singh. He married actress Farha Naaz, with whom he had a son born in year 2001. The couple divorced in year 2002. Vindu married model Dina Umarova in year 2006, with whom he has a daughter born in year 2009.

In May 2013, he was arrested for having links to bookies and involvement in the 2013 spot-fixing scandal.

Filmography

Films

 Aashiq Deewana (1992)
 Karan (1994)
 Rab Dian Rakhan (1996) 
Garv (2004)
Mujhse Shaadi Karogi (2004)
Maine Pyaar Kyun Kiya (2005)
Sri Ramadasu (2006)
Partner (2007)
Khushboo (2008)
Team - The Force (2009)
Kisse Pyaar Karoon (2009)
Kambakkht Ishq (2009)
Maruti
Housefull (2010)
The Lion of Punjab (2011)
Sri Rama Rajyam (2011)
Housefull 2 (2012)
Joker (2012)
Son of Sardaar (2012)
Jatt James Bond (2014)
 Forensic (2022)
 Udeekan Teriyan (2023)....Upcoming Punjabi film

Dubbing roles

Television

Reality shows

References

External links

 
 Vindu Dara Singh Official Website

1964 births
Living people

20th-century Indian male actors
21st-century Indian male actors
Big Brother (franchise) winners
Bigg Boss (Hindi TV series) contestants
Indian male film actors
Indian male television actors
Indian male voice actors
Male actors from Mumbai
Male actors in Hindi cinema
Male actors in Hindi television
Male actors in Punjabi cinema